Gustave Honoré Cotteau (7 December 1818, Auxerre – 10 August 1894, Paris) was a French judge, naturalist and paleontologist.

Biography 
He was educated in classical studies at the college in Auxerre, then studied law in Paris. He earned his law degree in 1840 and in 1846 was named a deputy judge in Auxerre. Later on, he served as a judge in the civil court of Coulommiers and as a civil court judge in Auxerre. He was also curator of the city museum in Auxerre.

He is best known for his study of living and fossil echinoids (sea urchins), of which, he amassed a collection of more than 500 different species. He was the author of many works associated with Echinoidea, and circumscribed numerous echinoid taxa, such as the fossil genera Asterocidaris and Cidaropsis. With Jules Triger, he circumscribed the fossil family Archiaciidae (1869).

In 1874 and 1886 he was president of the Société géologique de France. He was also a member of the Société d'Anthropologie de Paris and of the Société des sciences historiques et naturelles de l'Yonne.

Selected works 
He was an editor of Paléontologie française, a multi-volume series on French paleontology begun by Alcide d'Orbigny in 1840. The following are some of his many written works:

References

External links 
 IDREF.fr lengthy bibliography of Cotteau

1818 births
1894 deaths
People from Auxerre
French paleontologists
French naturalists
French zoologists
Presidents of Société géologique de France